Gavan Herlihy (born 16 January 1947) is a New Zealand former politician. He was educated at St. Kevin's College and University of Canterbury. He was a member of Parliament for the National Party from 1996 to 2002.

Before entering politics, Herlihy was a farmer.

Member of Parliament

Herlihy was first elected to Parliament in the 1996 election as MP for Otago, and was re-elected in the 1999 election. In the 2002 election, he lost narrowly to David Parker of the Labour Party.

This loss was surprising to many commentators, as the Otago region has traditionally regarded as a safely in National hands. Herlihy narrowly missed out on becoming a list MP, being two places below the cut-off line.

After parliament 

On 1 July 2011 Herlihy was appointed to the board of Landcare Research.

Herlihy is involved in rural support trusts.

References

1947 births
Living people
New Zealand people of Irish descent
New Zealand National Party MPs
University of Canterbury alumni
People educated at St Kevin's College, Oamaru
New Zealand farmers
Unsuccessful candidates in the 2002 New Zealand general election
Members of the New Zealand House of Representatives
New Zealand MPs for South Island electorates
21st-century New Zealand politicians